"Nous les amoureux" ("We, the Lovers" or "Us Lovers") was the winning song of the Eurovision Song Contest 1961, performed in French for  by French singer Jean-Claude Pascal.

The song was performed fourteenth on the night (following 's Dario Campeotto with "Angelique" and preceding the 's The Allisons with "Are You Sure?"). By the close of voting, it had received 31 points, placing it first in a field of 16 and thus helping Luxembourg to achieve the rare feat of moving from last to first in successive years.

The song tells the story of a thwarted love between the singer and his lover ("they would like to separate us, they would like to hinder us / from being happy"). The lyrics go on about how the relationship is rejected by others but will finally be possible ("but the time will come. [...] and I will be able to love you without anybody in town talking about it. [...] [God] gave us the right to happiness and joy."). Later, Pascal explained that the song was about a homosexual relationship and the difficulties it faced. As this topic would have been considered controversial in the early 1960s, the lyrics are ambiguous and do not refer to the lovers' gender. This allowed hiding the song's actual message, which was not understood in this way by the general public at the time.

Due to the contest overrunning in time, the reprise of this song was not shown in the UK. The UK's coverage ended shortly after the voting had finished and the winning song was declared.

It was succeeded as Luxembourgish representative that year by Camillo Felgen with "Petit bonhomme".

The song was also featured on Season 2, Episode 6 of A Very Secret Service.

Sources and external links
 Official Eurovision Song Contest site, history by year, 1961.
 Detailed info and lyrics, The Diggiloo Thrush, "Nous les amoureux".

Specific

Eurovision songs of Luxembourg
Eurovision songs of 1961
Eurovision Song Contest winning songs
His Master's Voice singles
1961 songs
LGBT-related songs